The MacMillan-Dilley House is a historic house at 407 Martin Avenue in Pine Bluff, Arkansas.  It is a two-story wood-frame structure, with a cross-gable roof configuration, and distinctive siding consisting of boards topped by moulding.  The underside of the extended roof gables are painted white, and the building has other features that are signatures of the Prairie School of design.  It was built in 1903 to a design by Chicago architect Hugh M.G. Garden, who had supposedly studied with the major exponent of the Prairie School style, Frank Lloyd Wright.

The house was listed on the National Register of Historic Places in 1976.

See also
National Register of Historic Places listings in Jefferson County, Arkansas

References

Houses completed in 1903
Houses in Pine Bluff, Arkansas
Houses on the National Register of Historic Places in Arkansas
National Register of Historic Places in Pine Bluff, Arkansas
Prairie School architecture